The Men's 100 metre freestyle competition of the 2021 FINA World Swimming Championships (25 m) was held on 20 and 21 December 2021.

Records
Prior to the competition, the existing world and championship records were as follows.

Results

Heats
The heats were started on 20 December at 10:26.

Semifinals
The semifinals were started on 20 December at 18:14.

Final
The final was held on 21 December at 18:35.

References

Men's 100 metre freestyle